Beiwu Town is a town on the southern portion of Shunyi District, Beijing. It shares border with Yang Town to the north, Dasungezhuang Town to the east, Gaolou and Yanjiao Towns to the south, and Lisui Town to the west. The town was home to a population of 13,980 according to the 2020 census.

History

Administrative divisions 
In 2021, Beiwu Town was composed of 15 villages:

Gallery

See also 

 List of township-level divisions of Beijing

References 

Towns in Beijing
Shunyi District